Marlene Beatriz Mendoza Bobadilla (born 5 April 1994) is a Paraguayan footballer who plays as a defender for Cerro Porteño. She was a member of the Paraguay women's national team.
Selección Paraguaya sub 17
Selección Paraguaya sub 20
Selección Paraguaya Mayores
Conmebol Libertadores Femenina con Cerro Porteño en mas de 3 ocaciones
Multicampeòn con Cerro Porteño

International career
Mendoza played for Paraguay at senior level in the 2018 Copa América Femenina.

References

1994 births
Living people
Women's association football defenders
Paraguayan women's footballers
Paraguay women's international footballers
Cerro Porteño players
21st-century Paraguayan women
20th-century Paraguayan women